Andrey Kudravets (born 2 September 2003) is a Belarusian professional footballer who plays for BATE Borisov.

Honours
BATE Borisov
Belarusian Cup winner: 2020–21
Belarusian Super Cup winner: 2022

References

External links 
 
 

2003 births
Living people
People from Barysaw
Sportspeople from Minsk Region
Belarusian footballers
Association football goalkeepers
Belarus international footballers
FC BATE Borisov players